Bright Stars FC, also Bright Stars, is a Ugandan football club based in Matugga, Uganda. They play in the top division of Ugandan football, the Ugandan Super League.

In September 2017, it was announced that Japan International Keisuke Honda, through his management company called Honda Estilo, bought a controlling interest in the club.

History
Bright Stars were founded in 1997. They were promoted to the Uganda Super League after winning the FUFA Big League in 2012-13. John Kayanja was the coach who led the Stars to the Super League.

For their inaugural top flight season in 2013-14 Bright Stars turned to Livingstone Mbabazi to coach the team. Bright Stars flirted with relegation but finished in 12th place, two spots above the drop.

Bright Stars made the 2019 Uganda Cup final, their first ever finals appearance, but were defeated 5–4 on penalties by Proline FC after the game finished at a 1–1 draw.

Stadium
In the 2014–15 season, the club moved to Mwererwe, in the Matugga neighborhood, north of Kampala, Uganda's capital and largest city. Previously, the team played at the 15,000 capacity Nakivubo Stadium.

References

External links
Website of Bright Stars Football Club

Football clubs in Uganda
Association football clubs established in 1997
1997 establishments in Uganda